Institute professor is the highest title that can be awarded to a faculty member at the Massachusetts Institute of Technology (MIT), a research university located in Cambridge, Massachusetts, United States. It is analogous to the titles of distinguished professor, university professor, or regents professor used at other universities in recognition of a professor's extraordinary research achievements and dedication to the school. At MIT, institute professors are granted a unique level of freedom and flexibility to pursue their research and teaching interests without regular departmental or school responsibilities; they report only to the provost. Usually no more than twelve professors hold this distinction at any one time. 

Institute professors are initially nominated by leaders representing either a department or school. The chair of the faculty then consults with the Academic Council and jointly appoints with the president an ad-hoc committee from various departments and non-MIT members to evaluate the qualifications and make a documented recommendation to the president. The final determination is made based upon recommendations from professionals in the nominee's field. The case is then reviewed again by the Academic Council and approved by the executive committee of the MIT Corporation. The position was created by President James R. Killian in 1951, and John C. Slater was the first to hold the title.

List of institute professorsCurrent<onlyinclude>

Former

Emeritus

Deceased

References

External links
 MIT online directory of Institute Professors and Institute Professors Emeriti
 MIT Facts: Faculty and Staff
 MIT's Spectrvm magazine article

Massachusetts Institute of Technology
Institute professors

Professorships